The Commander of the Ukrainian Air Force is the head of the professional and administrative head of the Ukrainian Air Force, and is under the Commander-in-Chief of the Armed Forces. The current Commander of the Air Force is Colonel General Mykola Oleschuk.

List of commanders

Pre-merger with the Air Defence Forces (1991-2004)
 1992 – 1993 Lieutenant General Valeriy Vasylyev
 1993 – 1999 Colonel General Volodymyr Mykhaylovych Antonets
 1999 – 2002 Colonel General Viktor Ivanovych Strelnykov (detained in 2002 due to the Sknyliv air show disaster)
 2002 – 2004 Lieutenant General Yaroslav Illich Skalko

Post-merger with the Air Defence Forces (2004–present)

See also
 Commander of the Ground Forces (Ukraine)
 Commander of the Navy (Ukraine)
 Commander of the Air Defence Forces (Ukraine)
 Commander of the Air Assault Forces (Ukraine)

References

Ukrainian Air Force
1991 establishments in Ukraine
Air force chiefs of staff